NRL Northern Territory (abbreviated as NRLNT, formerly the Northern Territory Rugby League) is the organisation responsible for administering the game of rugby league in the Northern Territory. It controls the Darwin Rugby League, Darwin Junior Rugby League and Central Australian Rugby Football League.

Northern Territory is an affiliated state of the overall Australian governing body the Australian Rugby League.

History

The first rugby league competition in Darwin took place in 1941. This competition was among servicemen stationed in Darwin during World War 2. The competition was suspended following the Japanese air raids on 19 February 1942 and did not recommence until 1943.

The game was not played on an organised basis after servicemen left the city at the end of the war until the formation of the Northern Territory Rugby Football League Association in 1950. The newly formed association's first game was held on 14 January 1951. Rugby league in the Northern Territory is being played at Richardson Park.

Competitions

Darwin Rugby League

Clubs

Central Australian Rugby Football League

Katherine Rugby League
The Katherine Rugby League is a rugby League competition in Katherine, Northern Territory.

Gove Rugby League 
The Gove Rugby League is a competition located in Gove, Northern Territory.

Notable NTRL juniors who competed in the NRL 
Alice Springs
Liam Knight (2016- Manly Sea Eagles, Canberra Raiders & South Sydney Rabbitohs)
Darwin Brothers
Frank Stokes (1990–94 Manly Sea Eagles)
Anthony Castro (1990 South Sydney Rabbitohs)
Federal United
Chris Nahi (1996–98 Gold Coast Chargers)
Waratahs
Steve Larder (1985–89 Illawarra Steelers)
Nightcliff Dragons
Gerry De La Cruz (1982 Canberra Raiders)
Duncan MacGillivray (1996–03 South Sydney Rabbitohs & Penrith)
Joel Romelo (Melbourne Storm)
Sam Irwin (Gold Coast Titans)
Chris Smith (2015- Penrith Panthers & Sydney Roosters)
Nhulunbuy
Will Chambers (Melbourne Storm)
Katherine Bushrangers
Luke Kelly (Melbourne Storm)
Palmerston Raiders
James McManus (Newcastle Knights)

See also

Rugby league in the Northern Territory
Darwin Rugby League

References

External links

Rugby league clubs in the Northern Territory

 
Rugby league governing bodies in Australia
Rugby league competitions in Australia
Rugby league in the Northern Territory
Ru
1950 establishments in Australia
Sports organizations established in 1950